Mamma Mia, What an Impression! (Italian: Mamma mia, che impressione!) is a 1951 Italian comedy film directed by Roberto Savarese and starring Alberto Sordi, Giovanna Pala and Carlo Giustini.

It was shot at the Farnesina Studios of Titanus in Rome. The film's sets were designed by the art director Alfredo Montori. It earned around 90 million lira at the box office.

Synopsis
Arturo and Alberto compete for the attention of an attractive young woman. While Arturo is a handsome athlete, Alberto is an overbearing idiot. In order to challenge his rival on his own territory Alberto decides to enter a marathon in Rome.

Cast
 Alberto Sordi as Alberto
 Giovanna Pala as La signora Margherita
 Carlo Giustini as Arturo
 Frank Colson as Don Isidoro
 Fausto Guerzoni as Venditore del presepio
 Luigi Pavese as Il giudice di gara
 Checco Rissone as L'uomo del panino 
 Vinicio Sofia as L'energumeno
 Riccardo Bertazzolo as Il bagnino
 Carlo Delle Piane as Testa di triangolo
 Franco Randisi as L'antipatico
 Marco Tulli as Ortelli
 Aldo Trifiletti as Gualandri
 Alberto D'Amario as Il colonnello Pisacane

References

Bibliography
 Chiti, Roberto & Poppi, Roberto. Dizionario del cinema italiano: Dal 1945 al 1959. Gremese Editore, 1991.

External links
 

1951 films
1950s Italian-language films
Films set in Rome
Films shot in Rome
Italian comedy films
1951 comedy films
Films with screenplays by Cesare Zavattini
Italian black-and-white films
Films directed by Roberto Savarese
1950s Italian films